Eishockeyclub Red Bull München (or EHC Red Bull München; English: Munich Red Bulls Ice Hockey Club) is a professional ice hockey team based in Munich, Germany. The club is a member of the Deutsche Eishockey Liga (DEL), the highest level of play in professional German ice hockey.

Between 2016 and 2018, the club has won 3 DEL titles in a row, as well as German Cup in 2010. The team plays its home games at Olympia Eishalle.

History
After the establishment of the club Eishockeyclub HC München 1998 on 19 January 1998, HC Munich began play in the Bezirksliga, where they won the district championship.

The club quickly moved up the ranks in German hockey in their first decade, winning league titles in both the Bayernliga. In 2003 the club changed its name to Eishockeyclub München. After getting promoted in 2003 from the Bavarian League to the Oberliga, the senior team was outsourced from the club to the EHC München Spielbetriebs GmbH in 2004. The club gained promotion to the 2.Bundesliga, whose championship they won in 2010.

By July 2010, EHC München had earned promotion into Germany's top league, the DEL. Furthermore, the club managed to reach the playoffs in its first season in the DEL. After financial problems the team got a new sponsor in 2012 and was renamed EHC Red Bull München. Since 1 May 2013, the company and the team have been owned by Red Bull GmbH and the company was renamed EHC Red Bull München GmbH.

Home arena

The team's home arena is called Olympia Eishalle, which seats 6,256 spectators.

New arena

SAP Garden is a planned 10,500-capacity indoor arena, to be built in Oympiapark, Munich. It is expected to be completed in 2024 at the earliest.

Honours

Domestic
Deutsche Eishockey Liga
  Winners: 2015–16, 2016–17, 2017–18, 2019–20 (Regular season)
  Runners-up: 2018–19, 2021–22
Deutscher Eishockey-Pokal
  Winners: 2010
2. Bundesliga
  Winners: 2010
  Runners-up: 2009
Bayernliga
  Winners: 2003
Bezirksliga
  Winners: 1999
Landesliga
  Runners-up: 2000
Oberliga
  Runners-up: 2005

European
Champions Hockey League
  Runners-up: 2018–19

Players

Current roster

References

External links
 

Ice hockey teams in Germany
Red Bull sports teams
Sport in Munich
Ice hockey clubs established in 1998
1998 establishments in Germany
Deutsche Eishockey Liga teams
Ice hockey teams in Bavaria